Bryansky Rybzavod is a rural locality (a selo) in Bryansky Selsoviet, Kizlyarsky District, Republic of Dagestan, Russia. The population was 61 as of 2010. There is 1 street.

Geography 
It is located 63 km northeast of Kizlyar, 5 km southeast from Bryansk.

Nationalities 
Dargins, Avars and Russians live there.

References 

Rural localities in Kizlyarsky District